Madonna's Pig (Dutch: Het varken van Madonna) is a 2011 Belgian fantasy film directed by Frank Van Passel.

Cast 
 Kevin Janssens as Tony Roozen
 Wine Dierickx as Maria Glorie
 Nico Sturm as Prosper
 Elise Bottu as Gusta
 Wim Opbrouck as Burgemeester

References

External links 

2011 fantasy films
2011 films
Belgian fantasy films
2010s Dutch-language films